Harald Julius von Bosse (28 September 1812 – 10 March 1894; Гаральд Юлиус Боссе) was a 19th-century architect and painter. He was descended from a Germano-Baltic noble family and was a subject of the Russian Empire.

Life
He was born in Lievburg nearby Saint Petersburg. He studied at Darmstadt and moved to Saint Petersburg in 1831. He worked in Alexander Brullov's studio and was made a free painter in the Imperial Academy of Arts in 1832, an academician there in 1839 and a professor there in 1854. He designed public buildings and became court architect in 1858. He retired in 1863 and moved to Dresden for health reasons, spending his final years there and in 1872 designing its Reformed Church and Russian Orthodox Church. Among his other well-known works is the German Church in Helsinki, Finland, a work attributed jointly to von Bosse and Swedish-born architect Carl Johan von Heideken, the work being completed in 1864. He died in Dresden.

Artistic method 
According to the aesthetics of the Historicism period, the architect Bosse tried his hand at different "historic styles". In his designs for country houses of the late 1830s to mid-1840s he worked mainly "in the English cottage style, using elements of Gothic decoration".

The architect's style evolved from strict classicism to the neo-Renaissance style. The neo-Renaissance style was adopted by the House of Ivan Pashkov on Liteyny Avenue in St Petersburg (1841-1844), similarly decorated are the facades of the residential buildings on Bolshaya Konyushennaya Street, the mansion of E.P. Saltykova on Bolshaya Morskaya and the mansions of M.V. Kochubey and A.A. Polovtsov. However, the interiors of the residences are decorated in different styles: Neo-Baroque, Neo-Rococo, Byzantine, Moorish and Gothic.

The facade of E. M. Buturlina's house on Tchaikovsky Street is one of the most striking examples of the "second baroque" in St. Petersburg, imitating the Winter Palace by Francesco Bartolomeo Rastrelli.

While rebuilding the Boudoir of Empress Maria Alexandrovna in the Winter Palace Bosse chose the Rococo style; he replaced the original blue colour with bright scarlet silk and gilded details.

See also
 List of German painters

References

External links
 

1812 births
1894 deaths
19th-century German architects
Russian architects
19th-century German painters
19th-century German male artists
German male painters
19th-century painters from the Russian Empire
Russian male painters
Baltic nobility
19th-century male artists from the Russian Empire